The Department of Military Veterans is a sub-department of the Department of Defence that is responsible for providing support and services to veterans of the South African military, including veterans of the armed wings of anti-apartheid movements (Umkhonto we Sizwe and APLA). The political head of the department is the Minister of Defence and Military Veterans;  this is Thandi Modise. Her deputy is Thabang Makwetla, and the administrative head of the department is Director-General Derrick Mgwebi.

References

External links
 
 South African Infantry Association

Dep
Government agencies established in 2009
Vet
Dep
South Africa